Borkowo may refer to the following places:
Borkowo, Kuyavian-Pomeranian Voivodeship (north-central Poland)
Borkowo, Masovian Voivodeship (east-central Poland)
Borkowo, Podlaskie Voivodeship (north-east Poland)
Borkowo, Kartuzy County in Pomeranian Voivodeship (north Poland)
Borkowo, Tczew County in Pomeranian Voivodeship (north Poland)
Borkowo, Sławno County in West Pomeranian Voivodeship (north-west Poland)
Borkowo, Świdwin County in West Pomeranian Voivodeship (north-west Poland)